Ants is an Estonian masculine given name. Notable people with the name include:
Ants Antson (1938–2015), Estonian speed skater and Olympic medalist
Ants Eskola (1908–1989), Estonian actor and singer
Ants Järvesaar (born 1948), Estonian farmer and politician
Ants Käärma (born 1942), Estonian agronomist and politician
Ants Kaljurand (Ants the Terrible; 1917–1951), partisan (Forest Brother)
Ants Kiviselg (born 1955), Estonian sport physician 
Ants Kurvits (1887–1943), Estonian military commander (major general)
Ants Laaneots (born 1948), Estonian military general, former Commander-in-Chief of the Estonian Defence Forces 
Ants Laikmaa (1866-1942), Estonian painter
Ants Lauter (1894-1973), Estonian actor, theatre director and pedagogue
Ants Leemets (1950–2019), Estonian politician and museum director
Ants Mängel (born 1987), Estonian badminton player
Ants Mellik (1926–2005), Estonian architect
Ants Nuut, Estonian trombonist, vocalist and tuba player for the rock band Apelsin
Ants Oidermaa (1891–1941), Estonian politician, diplomat and newspaper editor
Ants Oras (1900-1982), Estonian translator and writer
Ants Paju (11944–2011), Estonian politician, journalist, athlete and engineer
Ants Pärna (1935–2014), Estonian maritime historian and poet
Ants Piip (1884–1942), Estonian lawyer, diplomat and politician
Ants Soosõrv (born 1969), Estonian renju player and coach
Ants Soots (born 1956), Estonian conductor
Ants Tael (born 1936), Estonian dancer and dance pedagogue
Ants Tamme (born 1940), Estonian politician and journalist
Ants Taul (born 1950), Estonian musician and instrument-maker
Ants Vaino (1940–1971), Estonian racing driver
Ants Väravas (1937–2018), Estonian cyclist and coach 
Ants Veetõusme (born 1949), Estonian politician and financial and sports figure
Henn-Ants Kurg (1898–1943), Estonian colonel and diplomat

See also

Ant (name)
Antes (name)

References

Estonian masculine given names